Strzeganowice  is a village in the administrative district of Gmina Kąty Wrocławskie, within Wrocław County, Lower Silesian Voivodeship, in south-western Poland.

The village has a population of 240.

History
Strzeganowice dates back to the Middle Ages. The oldest known mention of the village comes from a document from 1155.

In January 1945, in the village, the Germans carried out a mass execution of a group of prisoners during the "death march" from the subcamp in Miłoszyce to the Gross-Rosen concentration camp. Some were buried alive. Two mass graves were discovered in 1974 and 1978.

References

Strzeganowice